Superloop may refer to:

 SuperLoop, a bus rapid transit system in San Diego, California
 Super Loops, later known as Fire Ball, an amusement ride by Larson Company
 SuperLOOP, a waterslide by ProSlide Technology; similar to the AquaLoop
 Superloop (connectivity services), an Australian telecommunications company founded by Bevan Slattery

See also
Adelaide 500, known as the Superloop Adelaide 500 for sponsorship reasons